Provincial road N707 (N707) is a road connecting N306 and N302 near Harderwijk with Zeewolde.

Exit list

External links

707
707